Stefania Gobbi (born 13 April 1995) is an Italian female rower twice bronze medal winner at senior level at the European Rowing Championships. She competed in the women's quadruple sculls event at the 2020 Summer Olympics.

Biography
Stefania Gobbi started her career in 2009, at the Canottieri Padova Club coached by Alberto Rigato.
He made his debut in the National Juniores in 2012 by winning a bronze medal at the European Junior Championships in quadruple scull and in 2013 he won the world junior title in quadruple scull, together with Chiara Ondoli., Valentina Iseppi . and Valentina Rodini.
In 2014 he joined the U23 national selection and after various participations in European and World Championships in 2017 he won the silver medal at the U23 World Championships in double scull together with Valentina Iseppi .
In 2017 he also won the first European Senior Bronze Medal in double scull, together with Kiri Tontodonati.
In 2019, always in double scull, she changes scull's partner, Stefania Buttignon., and after winning bronze at the Senior European Championships.
At the world championships in Linz they qualify the double scull at the Tokyo Olympics, in this discipline Italy's last participation dates back to the Beijing Olympics in 2008.
In 2021 participates in the Tokyo 2020 NE won fourth place in quadruple scull, together with Veronica Lisi and Alessandra Montessano  and Valentina Iseppi .
In 2021  wins world title in single scull costal rowing
In 2022, always in double scull, she changes scull's partner,  Kiri Tontodonati.

Achievements

References

External links
 

1995 births
Living people
Italian female rowers
Rowers of Centro Sportivo Carabinieri
Olympic rowers of Italy
Rowers at the 2020 Summer Olympics
20th-century Italian women
21st-century Italian women